Edward Allen Pierce (August 31, 1874 – December 16, 1974) was an American businessman and stock broker.  Pierce was most notable for leading the firm of A.A. Housman & Company through the 1920s and 1930s and turning the firm into the largest brokerage in the U.S..  The firm, which was renamed E.A. Pierce & Co. in recognition of Pierce, was one of the predecessors of Merrill Lynch, Pierce, Fenner & Smith.

Biography
Pierce was born in 1874 in Orrington, Maine, and attended Bowdoin College before dropping out. The college conferred an honorary Doctor of Laws degree on Pierce in 1956. In 1960, a second honorary Doctor of Laws was conferred on him by Brown University, where he was a trustee.

Pierce, who had worked as the manager of a lumber business in his twenties, gave up a comfortable $100 a week salary to become a clerk at A.A. Housman & Company in 1901. In 1921, he became the sole managing partner of the firm and led it through a major transformation becoming one of the leading Wall Street brokerage firms. In 1927, the firm was renamed E.A. Pierce & Co. in honor of his role in leading the firm. He died in December 1974 at the age of 100. 

According to his obituary, at the time of his death, he was survived by his wife, Luella Van Hoosear, age 102. This became the climax of a comedy routine, "Survived by his wife", by the late comedian, Alan King.

References

Robert Cole, "Edward A. Pierce" in Charles D. Ellis, James R. Vertin (eds) Wall Street people: True stories of the great barons of finance, vol 2, p. 14. John Wiley and Sons, 2003
"No. 1 Wire House". Time, February 4, 1935 
"Bigger Biggest". Time, November 10, 1930 

American brokers
Merrill (company) people
1874 births
1974 deaths
American centenarians
Men centenarians
Bowdoin College alumni
Businesspeople from Maine
People from Orrington, Maine